The Eastern Orthodox Church, officially the Orthodox Catholic Church, is a communion comprising the, up to, seventeen separate autocephalous (self-governing) hierarchical churches that recognise each other as canonical (regular) Eastern Orthodox Christian churches.

Each constituent church is self-governing; its highest-ranking bishop called the primate (a patriarch, a metropolitan or an archbishop) reports to no higher earthly authority. Each regional church is composed of constituent eparchies (or dioceses) ruled by bishops. Some autocephalous churches have given an eparchy or group of eparchies varying degrees of autonomy (limited self-government). Such autonomous churches maintain varying levels of dependence on their mother church, usually defined in a tomos or another document of autonomy. In many cases, autonomous churches are almost completely self-governing, with the mother church retaining only the right to appoint the highest-ranking bishop (often an archbishop or metropolitan) of the autonomous church.

Normal governance is enacted through a synod of bishops within each church.

Church governance
The Eastern Orthodox Church is decentralised, having no central authority, earthly head or a single bishop in a leadership role. Thus, the Eastern Orthodox use a synodical system canonically, which is significantly different from the hierarchical organisation of the Catholic Church that follows the doctrine of papal supremacy. References to the Ecumenical Patriarch of Constantinople as a sole authoritative leader are an erroneous interpretation of his title “first among equals". His title is of honor rather than authority and in fact the Ecumenical Patriarch has no real authority over churches other than the Constantinopolitan. His unique role often sees the Ecumenical Patriarch referred to as the "spiritual leader" of the Eastern Orthodox Church in some sources.

The autocephalous churches are normally in full communion with each other, so any priest of any of those churches may lawfully minister to any member of any of them, and no member of any is excluded from any form of worship in any of the others, including the reception of the Eucharist. However, there have been varying instances in the history of the Eastern Orthodox Church where communion has been broken between member churches, particularly over autocephaly issues and ecumenism with the Roman Catholic Church.

In the early Middle Ages, the early Christian church was ruled by five patriarchs as the state church of Rome: the bishops of Rome, Constantinople, Alexandria, Antioch, and Jerusalem, collectively referred to as the Pentarchy. Each patriarch had jurisdiction over bishops in a specified geographic region. This continued until 927, when the Bulgarian Patriarchate became the first newly promoted patriarchate to join the original five.

The Patriarch of Rome was "first in place of honour" among the five patriarchs. Disagreement about the limits of his authority was one of the causes of the Great Schism, conventionally dated to the year 1054, which split the state-recognised Church into the Catholic Church in the West, headed by the Bishop of Rome, and the Orthodox Church, led by the four eastern patriarchs (Constantinople, Jerusalem, Antioch and Alexandria). After the schism, this honorary primacy shifted to the Patriarch of Constantinople, who had previously been accorded second-place rank at the First Council of Constantinople.

In the 5th century, Oriental Orthodoxy separated from Chalcedonian Christianity (and is therefore separate from both the Eastern Orthodox and Catholic Church), well before the 11th century Great Schism. It should not be confused with Eastern Orthodoxy.

Jurisdictions

Autocephalous Eastern Orthodox churches

Ranked in order of seniority, with the year of independence (autocephaly) given in parentheses, where applicable. There are a total of 17 autocephalous Eastern Orthodox churches which are recognised at varying levels among the communion of the Eastern Orthodox Church.

Four ancient patriarchates
 Ecumenical Patriarchate of Constantinople (independence in 330 AD, elevated to the rank of autocephalous Patriarchate in 381, elevated 451 to second see, became first see due to departure of See of Rome in Great Schism)
 Greek Orthodox Patriarchate of Alexandria
 Greek Orthodox Patriarchate of Antioch
 Greek Orthodox Patriarchate of Jerusalem (independence in 451 AD, elevated to the rank of autocephalous Patriarchate in 451)

The four ancient Eastern Orthodox Patriarchates, along with the See of Rome, formed the historical Pentarchy. Remaining in communion with each other after the 1054 schism with Rome. The concept of the Pentarchy and the title of "Patriarch" itself, as opposed to Archbishop or Exarch, is attributed to  St Justinian in AD 531.

National patriarchates
 Bulgarian Orthodox Church (870, Patriarchate since 918/919, recognised by the Patriarchate of Constantinople in 927)
 Georgian Orthodox Church (Patriarchate since 1010)
 Serbian Orthodox Church (1219, Patriarchate since 1346)
 Russian Orthodox Church (1448, recognised in 1589)
 Romanian Orthodox Church (1872, recognised in 1885, Patriarchate since 1925)

Autocephalous archbishoprics 
Note:
 Church of Cyprus (recognised in 431)
 Church of Greece (1833, recognised in 1850)
 Albanian Orthodox Church (1922, recognised in 1937)
 Macedonian Orthodox Church (1967, recognised in 2022)

Autocephalous metropolises 
Note:
 Polish Orthodox Church (1924)
 Orthodox Church of the Czech Lands and Slovakia (1951)

Universally recognized as canonical, autocephaly disputed 
 Orthodox Church in America (granted by the Russian Orthodox Church in 1970 and recognized by five other churches, but not recognised by the Ecumenical Patriarchate or remaining Churches. Canonicality universally recognised)

Canonical and autocephalic status disputed 
 Orthodox Church of Ukraine (autocephaly from 15 December 2018, recognised by the Ecumenical Patriarchate on 5 January 2019 and 3 other churches. Autocephaly and canonicality rejected by remaining Churches)

Canonical and autocephalic status unregongnisted 
 The a minority of the Ukrainian Orthodox Church – Kyiv Patriarchate lead by Filaret (Denysenko) split again in 2019, following internal disputes and concerns as to whether the autocephaly granted by the Ecumenical Patriarchate amounted to true autocephaly due to the conditions imposed. They are not recognized by any Church.
 The Old Calendarists split from their local Church and are not recognized as canonical, nor do they recognize any of the above Churches as canonical. Some maintain communion with the Kyiv Patriarchate under Filaret.

Ranking
The order of the diptychs is that of the four ancient patriarchates as given above. However, though the remaining patriarchates always follow them, proceeding the other Autocephalous Churches, their ranking differs from place to place. In the diptychs of the Russian Orthodox Church and some of its daughter churches (e.g., the Orthodox Church in America), the ranking of the five junior patriarchates is Russia, Georgia, Serbia, Romania, and then Bulgaria. The ranking of the archbishoprics is the same, with the Church of Cyprus being the only ancient one (AD 431)

Autonomous Eastern Orthodox churches

under the Ecumenical Patriarchate of Constantinople
 Estonian Apostolic Orthodox Church (autonomy recognised by the Ecumenical Patriarchate but not by the Russian Orthodox Church)
 Orthodox Church of Finland

under the Greek Orthodox Church of Antioch
 Antiochian Orthodox Christian Archdiocese of North America

under the Greek Orthodox Church of Jerusalem
 Church of Sinai

under the Russian Orthodox Church
 Belarusian Orthodox Church
 Metropolis of Chișinău and All Moldova
 Orthodox Church in Japan (autonomy recognised by the Russian Orthodox Church but not by the Ecumenical Patriarchate)
 Chinese Orthodox Church (autonomy recognised by the Russian Orthodox Church but not by the Ecumenical Patriarchate)

under the Romanian Orthodox Church
 Metropolis of Bessarabia
 Romanian Orthodox Metropolis of the Americas

 Romanian Orthodox Metropolis of Western and Southern Europe

Independent
 Ukrainian Orthodox Church (Moscow Patriarchate)

Semi-autonomous churches

under the Ecumenical Patriarchate of Constantinople
 Church of Crete
under the Russian Orthodox Church
 Estonian Orthodox Church of the Moscow Patriarchate
 Russian Orthodox Church Outside Russia

Limited self-government (not autonomy)
under the Ecumenical Patriarchate of Constantinople
 Monastic community of Mount Athos
 Greek Orthodox Archdiocese of Italy and Malta
 Korean Orthodox Church
 Exarchate of the Philippines
 American Carpatho-Russian Orthodox Diocese
 Ukrainian Orthodox Church of Canada
 Ukrainian Orthodox Church of the USA

under the Russian Orthodox Church
Archdiocese of Russian Orthodox churches in Western Europe

under the Romanian Orthodox Church
Ukrainian Orthodox Vicariate Sighetu Marmației

Unrecognised churches

True Orthodox

True Orthodox Christians are groups of traditionalist Eastern Orthodox churches which have severed communion since the 1920s with the mainstream Eastern Orthodox churches for various reasons, such as calendar reform, the involvement of mainstream Eastern Orthodox in ecumenism, or the refusal to submit to the authority of mainstream Eastern Orthodox Church. The True Orthodox Church in the Soviet Union was also called the Catacomb Church; the True Orthodox in Romania, Bulgaria, Greece and Cyprus are also called Old Calendarists.

These groups refrain from concelebration of the Divine Liturgy with the mainstream Eastern Orthodox, while maintaining that they remain fully within the canonical boundaries of the Church: i.e., professing Eastern Orthodox belief, retaining legitimate apostolic succession, and existing in communities with historical continuity.

The churches which follow True Orthodoxy are:
 Old Calendarists (numerous groups)
 Serbian True Orthodox Church
 Russian True Orthodox Church (Lazar Zhurbenko)
 Russian Orthodox Autonomous Church
 True Orthodox Metropolis of Germany and Europe

Old Believers 

Old Believers are divided into various churches which do not recognize each others, nor the mainstream Eastern Orthodox Church.

Churches that are not recognised despite wanting to 
The following churches recognize all other mainstream Eastern Orthodox churches, but are not recognised by any of them due to various disputes:
 Abkhazian Orthodox Church
 American Orthodox Catholic Church
 Belarusian Autocephalous Orthodox Church
 Latvian Orthodox Church
 Montenegrin Orthodox Church
 Ukrainian Orthodox Church – Kyiv Patriarchate
 Turkish Orthodox Church

Churches that are neither recognised nor fully Eastern Orthodox

The following churches use the term "Orthodox" in their name and carries belief or the traditions of Eastern Orthodox church, but blend beliefs and traditions from other denominations outside of Eastern Orthodoxy:
 Evangelical Orthodox Church (blends with Protestant - Evangelical and Charismatic - elements)
 Orthodox-Catholic Church of America (blends with Catholic and Oriental Orthodox elements)
 Nordic Catholic Church in Italy (originally called the Orthodox Church in Italy, it had ties with the UOC-KP; now associates with the Nordic Catholic Church and the Union of Scranton)
 Lusitanian Catholic Orthodox Church (blends with Catholic elements)
 Communion of Western Orthodox Churches (blends with Oriental Orthodox elements)
 Celtic Orthodox Church
 French Orthodox Church
 Orthodox Church of the Gauls

See also 
 Hierarchy of the Catholic Church
 Catholic Church by country
 List of Lutheran dioceses and archdioceses

Notes

References

External links
 Territorial Jurisdiction According to Orthodox Canon Law. The Phenomenon of Ethnophyletism in Recent Years, a paper read at the International Congress of Canon Law, 2001 (Ecumenical Patriarchate website)
 World Churches at Orthodox Church in America website
 Religious Organisations - Orthodox Churches at WorldStatesmen.org

Organisation
Ecclesiastical polities